HDMS Dykkeren was the first Danish submarine built by FIAT San Giorgio for the Royal Danish Navy and commissioned in 1909. In 1910, Dykkeren was equipped with radiotelegraphy equipment, thereby becoming one of the first submarines in the world to have this. In 1916, Dykkeren collided with a ship, causing the submarine to sink, everyone apart from the chief, First Lieutenant Christensen, is saved.

References

Bibliography

1909 ships
Ships built in Italy
Submarines of the Royal Danish Navy
Maritime incidents in 1916
Submarines sunk in collisions